Éxitos Eternos is the first compilation album by Colombian-American singer-songwriter Soraya. It was released in 2005 by Universal Music.

Track listing
 De Repente
 ¿En Dónde Estás?
 Cuerpo Y Alma
 París, Calí, Milán
 Avalancha
 Lejos De Aquí
 Half
 Torre De Marfil 
 En Esta Noche
 When Did I Say That?
 Quédate
 Dance Of The Waiting
 Pueblito Viejo
 You And I
 Cuerpo Y Alma (Multimedia Track)

Personnel
 Valério Do Carmo → Art Direction, Illustrations
 Luis Gómez Escolar → Translation
 Judy Figueroa → Graphic Design
 Bruce McIntosh → Compilation, Concept
 Randy Suarez → Critic, Project Coordinator

References

2005 greatest hits albums
Universal Music Mexico albums
Soraya (musician) albums